The following list sorts countries by their estimated male to female income ratio according to the Gender Development Index of the United Nations. The ratio is determined by comparing the gross national income per woman with the gross national income per man in 2017.

* indicates "Gender inequality in COUNTRY or TERRITORY" links.

References 

Gender equality
income ratio